Autpert Ambrose (Ambroise) (ca. 730 – 784) was a Frankish Benedictine monk.

He became abbot of San Vincenzo al Volturno in South Italy in the time of Desiderius, king of the Lombards.  Autpert's election as abbot caused internal dissent at St. Vicenzo, and both Pope Stephen III and Charlemagne intervened.  The disagreement was based both on objections to Autpert's personality and to his Frankish origin.

He wrote a considerable number of works on the Bible and religious subjects generally. Among these are commentaries on the Apocalypse, on the Psalms, and on the Song of Solomon; Lives of Saints Paldo, Tuto and Vaso; Assumption of the Virgin; and a Combat between the Virtues and the Vices.

In 2009, Pope Benedict XVI gave a homily about him in Saint Peter's square. In this homily, Autpert's death date is given as 784 (older scholarship had given a date between 778 and 779).

References

External links

730s births
784 deaths
Frankish Benedictines
Year of birth uncertain
8th-century Frankish writers
8th-century Latin writers